Aris FC, commonly known as Aris Thessaloniki FC, AFC or simply Aris, is a Greek professional football club based in the city of Thessaloniki, Macedonia, Greece. Created in 1914 as Aris Thessaloniki Football Club, the club was a founding member of the Macedonian Football Clubs Association, as well as the Hellenic Football Federation. The colours of the club are golden/yellow, a dominant colour in the culture of Macedonia and reminiscent of the Byzantine heritage of Thessaloniki, and black. It is named after Ares, the ancient Olympian "God of War," associated also with courage and masculinity, whose image is portrayed on the club's logo as depicted in the Ludovisi Ares sculpture.

Aris Thessaloniki was also one of the strongest and most popular teams in Greece during the interwar period. They have won the Greek championship three times (1928, 1932, 1946), the Greek Cup once (1970), and they had an undefeated home record in European competitions for 28 matches from 1968 to 2020, when they lost to Kolos. The team's home ground is the Kleanthis Vikelidis Stadium.

History

Foundation and golden years: 1920–1950

The club was established as a football club ("Podosferikos Syllogos Aris Thessalonikis") by a group of 22 young friends in a coffee bar in Votsi area on 25 March 1914 and given the name Aris from Ares, the ancient god of war. Its nickname was inspired by the two Balkan Wars of 1912–1913, when Greece fought against the Ottoman Empire before engaging in a war with Bulgaria. In Greek mythology, Aris was a deity who was in conflict with Heracles, the mythological character after which Aris's rival football team, Iraklis, was named. Aris holds a fierce rivalry with PAOK. At first, the club was based on a near the Arch and Tomb of Galerius, but after the accession of two minor football clubs in 1919 and 1921 the club's base was moved near to Flemming Street of eastern Thessaloniki. The first stadium was built on the site where Mars Field Park currently lies on Stratou Avenue. Quickly the club became very popular and soon new teams apart from football were established.

During this early stage of football in Greece no professional league was established. Instead, three minor leagues [in Macedonia (E.P.S.M.), Athens (E.P.S.A.) and Piraeus (E.P.S.P.)] were created, with the champions of each league competing in a postseason mini tournament to claim the title of the national champion. The first official game was held in 1923 against Megas Alexandros Thessaloniki (Alexander the Great), another Thessalonician team. That year marked the first title, when Aris was named regional champion of Macedonia, something that was repeated next year.

In 1926 the club was renamed "Athletic Club Aris Thessaloniki" to include also other sports than football.

Aris' first major success was between 1927 and 1928 when they won the first Greek Championship, beating finalists Atromitos and Ethnikos Piraeus exploiting the abstention from the championship teams of RECs. In the first race on 24 May, the team of Thessaloniki prevailed 3–1 Atromitos, while three days after losing to Ethnikos Piraeus 3–2. In iterative matches played in June in Thessaloniki, Aris won both of his opponents by 3–1 and thus crowned the first champion of Greece. Coach of the team was the German Thomas Kessler, and prominent players of Aris were, among others, Kostas Vikelidis, Savvas Vogiatzis that emerged and top scorer with six goals, Nikos Aggelakis, scorer of the finals with four goals and Dionysis Caltech.

The following year, it was held the final stage of national championships although Aris won the championship title in Thessaloniki, playing two matches barrage against PAOK. The first took place on 12 May 1929 and ended 1–1, while the second was held on 2 June with Aris to beats 4–3, having Nikos Aggelakis scoring a hat-trick.

On 20 April 1929, the first friendly match took place between Aris and Panathinaikos, the "yellows" to defeat 5–4.
The second championship came four years later in 1932, only this time his opponents were Olympiacos, Panathinaikos, AEK, Ethnikos, PAOK and Iraklis. Aris managed to collect 22 points in this mini tournament, four more than the second, Panathinaikos, scoring large wins like 7–0 against Panathinaikos, 7–3 against Iraklis and 3–0 versus AEK and Olympiacos in Athens, also new star players emerged, Kitsios, Aggelakis, Bogdanos, Gigopoulos, while Belgian manager De Valer guided effectively the club.

Four years after winning the first Panhellenic title, the "yellows" won the championship. Aris became champion amassing a total of 22 points, four more than second Panathinaikos and scoring big wins like 7–0 against Panathinaikos with four goals Maywood, 6–1 on Apollon Athens with six goals in the Aggelakis' first home appearance with the first group of Kleanthis Vikelidis, 7–3 vs Iraklis with four goals Kitsos and away 0–3 over Olympiacos, PAOK and AEK. Leading scorer of the league emerged Nikos Kitsos with 15 goals and Nikos Aggelakis to 14.

Big stars of that team were Kitsos, Aggelakis, Caltech, and Vogdanou Gkikopoulos while coach De Valera.

That same year, the EPO instituted for the first time the Greek Cup, Mars crashing Panathinaikos 7–2 in the quarterfinal. This was followed by victory over Apollon Athens, to reach the final where they lost 5–3 from AEK Athens, losing the chance to win the first doubles.

Aris won their third title in 1946, playing against two teams, AEK from Athens and Olympiacos from Piraeus, champions of the other two minor domestic leagues. Aris beat Olympiacos twice, scoring two goals and conceding none; came to a draw with AEK in Athens and defeated them in PAOK's stadium in Thessaloniki (score 4–1). Aris has not won a championship since the establishment of the First Division (1959).

Up to 1959, when the united First Division was created, Aris managed to finish first 14 times in the Macedonian division.

Modern times (1950–1981)

Aris' status remained high during this period, which was marked by the construction of the club's homeground, the Kleanthis Vikelides Stadium, named after the legendary homonymous player. Before World War II, Aris' homeground was located in the center of the city, near the Thessaloniki International Fair, but was abandoned in 1936 in order for the Pedion tou Areos park (Mars Field) to be created. The club managed to buy some land during 1951 in a quarter of the city named Charilaou, where the new Stadium was slowly built.

Also in 1959, the tripartite minor league system was abandoned and a new, unified Championship was created.

The club's accomplishments during these years were significant. It was one of the first teams in Greece to qualify for European tournaments. Under the leadership of Alexandros Alexiades, Giorgos Pantziaras and Takis Loukanidis.

1970 Cup Winners
Aris earned high placings in the League during the 1960s and 1970s, with apex the 1970 Hellenic Cup Title against the club's fierce rival, PAOK, in Kaftanzoglio Stadium.

In the 1970s, Aris was reorganized and a vast number of young players from Thessaloniki, including Kouis, Foiros, Drambis, Zindros and Papafloratos led the club. Its most important achievements during that period included a successful 1980 UEFA campaign when Aris eliminated Benfica and Perugia. Aris was also the first Greek club to score a victory both in Italy and Portugal. At home, the team shared first place with Olympiacos at the end of the 1980 campaign, though it lost the title 2–0 in a tie-breaker against the Piraeus club in Volos National Stadium.

Stone years (1981–2006)

After the mid-1980s and the retirement of the club's honored old guard, Aris entered in a slow decline, rarely reaching European league qualification or notable Greek League position, which—in combination with appreciable financial troubles that left the club near bankruptcy—led to the club's relegation to the Second Division in 1997 and 2005. Both times though Aris managed to resume its place in the first division.

Aris Members' Society era (2006–2014)

In recent years, specially after the creation of an Aris Members' Society that controls the club's fortunes, Aris has qualified several times for the UEFA Europa League, finished fourth in the Super League three times, and has reached in the Greek Cup Final four times, losing in 2003, 2005, 2008 and 2010, when 25,000 Aris fans went to Athens in the biggest ever move of fans in Greece. In 2008 and 2010 Aris made it through to the UEFA Europa League group stage after eliminating Real Zaragoza and Austria Wien respectively during the Cup's play-off rounds. During the 2010–11 UEFA Europa League they managed to play for the first time in club's history in Europe after Christmas, after a very good appearance in the group stage where they won 1–0 at home and 2–3 away and eliminated the title holders Atlético Madrid. Recent developments include the interest from the club's board to construct a new, modern stadium in eastern Thessaloniki Metropolitan Area to replace the obsolete Kleanthis Vikelidis Stadium and the modernization and expansion of the club's training facilities in Neo Rysio, Thessaloniki.
Also, in a unique move for Greek standards, the board decided in December 2009 to establish a radio station, Aris FM 92.8 in order to promote the communication between Aris fans around the country and the coverage of the clubs activities. In 2014, due to financial problems Aris was relegated to the third tier of Greek football.

Relegation
After their relegation many were wondering who was going to take care of the team. American business man Alex Kalas emerged the first season with him in charge of the football department while they failed to gain promotion to the Football League. In summer 2015 where the next elections for the role of head of football department Kalas won again and promised to put more money into the club.  Kalas also made a number of signings, Honduran legend Carlos Costly, Sierra Leone international John Kamara, Spaniard Guillermo Pérez Moreno, Portuguese footballer Fábio Ruben Moreira Tavares, defender Paschalis Melissas and defender Stavros Petavrakis. Due to Aris failing to get into the second division Kalas was sacked despite only being there for a month. Aris would have to play another year in Gamma Ethniki.
While in the Gamma Ethniki, the team demanded that the Hellenic Football Federation allow them to be promoted to a higher level of Greek football. The federation declined to do this and several appeals against the decision were rejected. As a result, 10,000 fans took to the streets on the 26 and 31 August 2015 in Thessaloniki to protest the decision. These protests caused clashes between the police and the fans that led to arrests and Aris didn't manage to get promoted to the professional divisions.

Karipidis era
Although after the Aris election Arvanitidis became leader of the football department, Theodoros Karipidis was named the head of football department the day afterwards. He signed many players in a few days including former Greek footballer of the club Andreas Tatos, former Real Madrid defender Raul Bravo club legend Sergio Koke, as well as many Super League quality players like Kostas Kaznaferis, Vasilios Rovas, Nikos Tsoumanis, Giannis Siderakis as well as many others. Theodoros Karipidis appointed Nikos Anastopoulos as the manager. During the 2015–16 season Aris managed to be promoted to the second division of Greece with a 21-point difference from the second club. Finally, Irene Karypidis became the major shareholder with overwhelming proportion over 89%.

Supporters
Aris' fan base is spread across all the economic classes in the city of Thessaloniki and all over Greece. Their rivalry is against clubs such as arch-rival PAOK, but also against the biggest clubs of Athens Panathinaikos and AEK Athens. Matches against PAOK are local derbies and an event that splits Thessaloniki and Northern Greece in two. Aris' main fan club is called Super 3 and has a symbol a bulldog. It exist since 1988 with 50 more Super 3 clubs spread all over Greece and Europe. There are over 12,000 Super 3 members. In the rest of Europe there are also some organized Aris' fan clubs in countries such as Germany, Italy and Sweden. According to some polls Aris is the 5th most popular team in Greece with around 300.000 fans, an amount quite big considering the lack of titles for many decades.

Against Panathinaikos in the 2010 Greek Cup final, 30,000 Aris fans descended to Athens to what has been described as the biggest football fans move in Greece.

The club's anthem (Aris Victorious) was written in 1926.

Crest and colours

Crest evolution

A company of young Thessalonians inspired the name of the club by Ares, the ancient Olympian "God of War", after the successful military operations of the Kingdom of Greece during the Balkan Wars, and the liberation of Thessaloniki in 1912 from the Ottoman empire. The emblem of the team is a resting Ares (Greek: Άρης), as depicted in the Ludovisi Ares sculpture. This emblem was chosen in the late 1970s to replace an older and simpler logo which was used since 1914. Also, during the 2000s, a scheme of meander was added to the crest.

The colors of the team are yellow or gold of glory, dominant colour in the culture of Macedonia, and black. Alternative colours also used include white or even dark red uniforms. During the 2000s, the club introduced also a shade of lime.

Kit evolution
First

Alternative

Shirt and sponsors history
The following table shows in detail Aris kit manufacturers and shirt sponsors by year:

Facilities

Stadium

The stadium of Aris Thessaloniki is named Kleanthis Vikelides after the club's legendary player. It is located at 69 Alkminis, Charilaou; 54249 Thessaloniki, and was built in 1951. In 1972, it got a new roof, in 1975 a new north stand, and in 2004, it was fully renovated. Its current total capacity is 22,800 spectators.

Training facilities

Since the late 1970s, Aris Thessaloniki has created its own training grounds in Neo Rysio (Dasygenio Sports Center), just outside Thessaloniki near the International Airport covering three hectares and including football fields, hosting area with gym, pool and sauna, press room, offices, restaurant and locker rooms. The facilities were rebuilt in September 2010 after a demand placed by manager Héctor Cúper. The facilities were renovated again in 2018 and the grass was ultimately changed in 2019.

Players

Current squad

Other players under contract

Honours

Domestic
Super League Greece
Winners (3): 1927–28, 1931–32, 1945–46
 Runners-up  (3):  1929–30, 1932–33, 1979–80

Second Division Greece
Winners (1): 1997–98
 Runners-up (1): 2017–18
Third Division Greece
 Winners (1): 2015–16 
 Runners-up (1): 2014–15
 Greek Football Cup
Winners (1): 1969–70
Runners-up (8): 1931–32, 1932–33, 1939–40, 1949–50, 2002–03, 2004–05, 2007–08, 2009–10
 Greater Greece Cup 
Winners (1): 1970–71
Macedonia Championship
Winners (12): 1923–24, 1925–26, 1927–28, 1928–29, 1929–30, 1930–31, 1933–34, 1937–38, 1945–46, 1948–48, 1952–53, 1958–59

Seasons in the 21st Century 

Best position in bold.

Key: 3R = Third Round, 4R = Fourth Round, 5R = Fifth Round, GS = Group Stage, QF = Quarter-finals, SF = Semi-finals, RU = Runner-up.

Aris Thessaloniki in Europe

Team statistics

Last updated: 11 August 2022

Managerial history

Statistics

League top scorers

Most league appearances

Most goals in a League match

Super League top scorers

Personnel

Ownership and current board

Coaching staff

Medical staff

Aris Thessaloniki presidents

See also
 Aris Thessaloniki
 Aris BC
 Aris Volleyball Club

References

External links

Official websites
Official website 
Aris Thessaloniki at Super League 
Aris Thessaloniki at UEFA
News sites
Aris Thessaloniki on allaboutaris.com 
Aris Thessaloniki on pressaris.gr 
Aris Thessaloniki on offside24.gr 
Club-owned Radio Station
Media
Official Facebook page
Official YouTube channel

 
Aris Thessaloniki
Football clubs in Thessaloniki